Verdine Adams White (born July 25, 1951) is an American musician, best known as a founding member and bassist for the band Earth, Wind & Fire. White was placed at No. 19 on Rolling Stone's list of The 50 Greatest Bassists of All Time.

Early life 

Verdine was born Verdine Adams, Jr. in Chicago, Illinois, on July 25, 1951. His father, Verdine Sr., was a doctor who also played the saxophone. He grew up listening to recordings of Miles Davis, John Coltrane, and other jazz musicians. He was also influenced by Cleveland Eaton, The Beatles, the Motown sound, and his two drummer brothers, Fred and Maurice. When he was 15, he saw a double bass in his high school orchestra class and decided that he wanted to play bass.

He soon got a red electric bass and, taking the advice of brother Maurice and his father, took private lessons from Radi Velah of the Chicago Symphony Orchestra, learning the Billè double bass method, and on weekends learned the electric bass with Chess Records session bassist and trombonist Louis Satterfield, who would later become a member of Earth, Wind & Fire's famed horn section, The Phenix Horns. Verdine says he learned everything about the bass guitar from Louis Satterfield, and some of his early bass influences were James Jamerson, Paul McCartney, and Gary Karr.

Moving toward a newly bought Fender Telecaster Bass instead of the upright bass, Verdine began working the Chicago club scene with local bands. Meanwhile, brother Maurice, who was a former session drummer at Chess Records and a member of pianist Ramsey Lewis' trio, had formed the Salty Peppers, scoring a local hit that caught the ears of Capitol Records.

In early 1970 Maurice moved to Los Angeles, hoping to record the group, which he had renamed Earth, Wind & Fire and called up Verdine asking whether he would like to join, which he did, arriving in Los Angeles on June 6, 1970.

Earth, Wind & Fire

As Earth, Wind & Fire's bassist since the band's inception, White has won six and received two honoree Grammy Awards, has been Grammy nominated eighteen times and has also been inducted into the Rock and Roll Hall of Fame and the Vocal Group Hall of Fame to name a few honors. The band has also earned more than 50 gold and platinum albums and have sold over 90 million albums worldwide.

In November 2008 White was presented with Bass Player magazine's Lifetime Achievement Award by Nathan East.  On Friday, February 26, 2010 Verdine was inducted as a member of Phi Beta Sigma Fraternity at the ceremony held at the Crowne Plaza Beverly Hills Hotel in Los Angeles, California. Verdine White holds an honorary doctorate degree from the American Conservatory of Music.

On July 2, 2020, Rolling Stone Australia Magazine ranked White number 19 on "The 50 Greatest Bassists of All Time".

Songwriter
White's credits as a songwriter date back to Earth, Wind & Fire's self-titled debut studio album, on which White co-wrote "C'mon Children" and "Bad Tune". White co-wrote three songs on their third album, Last Days and Time. He had one writing credit on their fourth album, Head To The Sky. On their fifth album, Open Our Eyes, White co-wrote the group's first top 5 R&B/Soul hit (No. 4), "Mighty, Mighty" along with his brother Maurice. They also co-wrote, "Kalimba Story", a top 10 R&B/Soul hit (No. 6). These two songs along with their single, "Devotion" (No. 23), helped the album top Billboard's Soul Album Chart, given them their first No. 1 album. White's co-writes include some of Earth, Wind & Fire's biggest hits, such as "That's the Way of the World".

White is credited on many artist's songs as heard in commercials, movie soundtracks, and televisions shows.

Philanthropy
White is the co-founder and director of the Verdine White Foundation, which aims to provide musical education to underprivileged and gifted students. During 2007 he was as well inducted into the Boys and Girls Club's Alumni Hall of Fame.

White is the founder of the non profit organization, The Verdine White Performing Arts Center (VWPAC), located in Los Angeles. Founded in 2010, VWPAC encourages students to reach their fullest potential as artists and people, equipped with a well-rounded performing arts education and the confidence to take on whatever path they choose within the arts.

Author
In 1978, White co-authored a book with Louis Satterfield, "Playing the Bass Guitar".

Personal life
Verdine White lives in Los Angeles in a house built in 1919, with his wife of 40 years Shelly Clark. She was once a member of R&B groups The Ikettes and Honey Cone. They have a son and a granddaughter. He also has a twin sister by the name of Geraldine. He is the younger half-brother of Earth, Wind, and Fire band founder Maurice White (December 19, 1941 – February 4, 2016), and older brother of drummer Fred White (January 13, 1955 – January 1, 2023), and Monte White, (October 16, 1953 - April 21, 2020). Both were members of Earth, Wind & Fire. Fred played drums and percussion as a band member from 1974 to 1984 and was inducted with the band into the Rock & Roll Hall of Fame in 2000. Monte served as the group's tour manager from 1974 to 1984.

Discography

With Earth, Wind & Fire

Backing Musician and Production Credits
1974 Ramsey Lewis: Sun Goddess - (bass, vocals)
1975 Ramsey Lewis: Electric Collection - (bass, vocals)
1976 Gene Harris: In a Special Way - (bass)
1976 The Emotions: Flowers - (bass)
1976 Deniece Williams: This Is Niecy - (bass)
1977 The Emotions: Rejoice - (bass)
1977: Gene Harris: Tone Tantrum - (bass)
1977: Lenny White: Big City
1977: Harvey Mason: Funk in a Mason Jar
1977: Pockets: Come Go With Us - (producer)
1977 Deniece Williams : Song Bird - (bass)
1978 The Emotions: Sunbeam - (bass)
1978 Eumir Deodato: Love Island - (bass)
1979 Harvey Mason: Groovin You - (bass)
1983 Level 42: Standing in the Light - (producer)
1992 Norman Brown: Just Between Us
1997 Urban Knights: Urban Knights II - (bass, producer)
2002 Jennifer Lopez: This Is Me... Then - (bass)
2012 Solange:   True - (bass)
2014 Freddie Ravel: Sol to Soul - (bass, associate producer)
2015 Flo Rida: I Don't Like It, I Love It - (bass)
2017 Kelly Clarkson: Meaning of Life - (bass)

Awards

RIAA Awards
Multi-Platinum Albums 
1975 - That's The Way Of The World 
1975 - Gratitude 
1976 - Spirit
Platinum Albums
1973 - Head To The Sky 
1974 - Open Our Eyes 
1981 - Raise! 
Gold Albums
1980 - Faces
1983 - Powerlight 
1987 - Touch The World 
1988 - The Best Of Earth, Wind & Fire Vol. II 
2003 - The Essential Earth, Wind & Fire 
Gold Singles
1975 - Shining Star 
1975 - Singasong 
1976 - Getaway 
1978 - September 
1978 - Got To Get You Into My Life 
1979 - Boogie Wonderland 
1979 - After The Love Has Gone 
1981 - Let's Groove

Inductions
1995 - Star on Hollywood's Walk Of Fame 
2000 - Rock & Roll Hall Of Fame 
2003 - Inducted into Hollywood's RockWalk 
2003 - Inducted into The Vocal Group Hall Of Fame
2010 - Songwriters Hall Of Fame 
2012 - Beacon of Change award at the Beacon Awards Banquet
2019 - Kennedy Center Honors

Grammy Awards
2016 - Lifetime Achievement Award 
2008 - GRAMMY Hall Of Fame, "Shining Star"
2004 - NARAS Signature Governors Award
1982 - Best R&B Performance By A Duo Or Group With Vocals, "Wanna Be With You"
1979 - Best R&B Vocal Performance By A Duo, Group Or Chorus, "After The Love Has Gone"
1979 - Best R&B Instrumental Performance, "Boogie Wonderland"
1978 - Best R&B Vocal Performance By A Duo, Group Or Chorus, "All 'n All"
1978 - Best R&B Instrumental Performance, "Runnin'"
1975 - Best R&B Vocal Performance By A Duo, Group Or Chorus, "Shining Star"

American Music Awards
1976 - Favorite Band, Duo Or Group - Soul/Rhythm & Blues  
1977 - Favorite Band, Duo Or Group- Soul/Rhythm & Blues
1978 - Favorite Band, Duo Or Group- Soul/Rhythm & Blues
1980 - Favorite Band, Duo Or Group- Soul/Rhythm & Blues

Other awards
1994 - NAACP Hall Of Fame Image Award  
2002 - BET Lifetime Achievement Award 
2002 - ASCAP Rhythm & Soul Heritage Award
2002 - TV Land's Entertainer Award 
2002 - The Daniel L. Stephenson Humanitarian Award for Lifetime Achievement in Music
2008 - Bass Player Lifetime Achievement Award 
2008 - Honorary Doctorates in the arts from Columbia College in Chicago 
2016 - Induction into The Soul Music Hall of Fame.
2021 - Mayor John Hamilton proclaimed February 1, 2021, Verdine White and Shelly Clark day in Bloomington, Indiana.

References

External links

Verdine White's official website
Verdine White Interview NAMM Oral History Library, January 20, 2014.

1951 births
Living people
African-American musicians
American funk bass guitarists
American male bass guitarists
Earth, Wind & Fire members
Guitarists from Chicago
20th-century American guitarists
 21st-century American guitarists
Kennedy Center honorees